The competition of the women's 10 metre platform  was held on June 3, the second day of the 2010 FINA Diving World Cup.

Results

Green denotes finalists

LEGEND

WDR = Withdrew

2010 FINA Diving World Cup